Agathodaimon are a gothic/symphonic black metal band from Mainz, Germany.

History
The band began in September 1995, when guitarist Sathonys and drummer Matthias got together to assemble a dominant death metal band with harmonic arrangements (melodic death metal). They put adverts in several music magazines in the hopes that they would find suitable musicians to play with them. In answer to the advertisement, they were joined by bassist Marko Thomas and keyboardist and vocalist Vlad Dracul. The last member of their initial formation was the second guitarist, Hyperion, who joined them by the end of that year. With this formation the band recorded the Carpe Noctem demo tape, which received fair reviews from the German specialized press. It also attracted the attention of one of Century Media's executives, who began keeping track of the band.
Agathodaimon then proceeded to play minor gigs and support some European bands. Eventually, they received an offer from Century Media to fund the recording of their second demo. This demo was recorded in early 1997 and was named Near Dark. It attracted the interest of quite a few recording labels, and in the end the band opted to sign with Nuclear Blast.
After successfully composing the songs for their debut album Blacken the Angel, one of the members of Agathodaimon, Vlad, was forced to quit the band due to problems with immigration. After returning to his native Romania, he was denied re-entry in Germany. The situation involved the fact that he had left the country during Nicolae Ceaușescu's regime. The band therefore was forced to make use of guest musicians to record their debut. Akaias (from Asaru) did the vocals and Marcel "Vampallens" (from Nocte Obducta) took the role of the keyboards. Vlad's participation on the album was restricted to the solo song "Contemplation Song", which was sent to the band via air mail.
The CD caused some impact, and Agathodaimon proceeded to tour with bands such as Children of Bodom and Hypocrisy. At the height of the album's success they opened gigs for Dimmu Borgir, Lacrimosa and other bands.
In 1999, Vampallens decided to quit the band in order to dedicate himself fully to his main project Nocte Obducta. He was replaced by female keyboardist Christine S. 
To record their second album - Higher Art of Rebellion - the band travelled to Romania, in order to be able to play together with Vlad. The vocalist Akaias also participated in the recording of this album, as well as singer Dan Byron performing clean vocals. Recordings took place at Magic Sound in Bucharest. A European tour as headliner with Graveworm and Siebenbürgen followed.
After a short hiatus, the band recorded the album Chapter III in 2001 at the Kohlekeller Studio in Germany.
Some changes to the band's structure followed, with Vlad definitely quitting the band, soon followed by Marko and Christine. 
Marko did leave because of health problems and quit making music, while Christine formed her own band Demonic Symphony, where she handles bass guitar and vocals. Marko and Christine were replaced by Darin Smith and Felix Ü. Walzer.
In 2004 the band released the album Serpent's Embrace, which again was recorded at Kohlekeller Studio with Kristian Kohlmannslehner as producer. 
In early 2006 personal differences led to the split of Eddy and the rest of the band. A new bass player named Till (formerly active in Misanthropic, where Matthias also played drums for a while) joined the ranks, and the song writing for the next album took place. Singer, guitarist Frank "Akaias" Nordmann left in January 2007 to carry on with other musical interests.

Matthias and Jonas left the band in 2008, with Manuel Steitz taking over on drums, and in October 2008, the band announced that they had recruited a new singer, Ashtrael.

In 2009 the band released their fifth studio album Phoenix. The next album In Darkness was released in 2013 on Massacre Records.

On October 28, 2014, the band announced that they had broken up due to some members not being fully dedicated to the band, but that they could possibly reunite in the future.

On July 10, 2020, the band announced that they had reunited. They released their seventh album The Seven on March 18, 2022.

Members

Current members
 Martin "Sathonys" Wickler – guitars, clean vocals (1995–2014, 2020–present)
 Chris "Ashtrael" Bonner – lead vocals (2008–2014, 2020–present)
 Michael "Nakhateth" Wöss – guitars (2020–present)
 Max Jansch – bass (2020–present)
 Oliver "Mortos" Kraus – drums (2020–present)

Past members
 Matthias "Matze" Rodig – drums (1995–2008)
 Carl "Hyperion" Lang – guitars (1995–2002)
 Marko Thomas – bass (1995–2002)
 Rusu "Vlad Dracul" Andrei – keyboards (1995–1999), vocals (1995–2002)
 Frank "Akaias" Nordmann – vocals (1998–2007), guitars (1998)
 Christine Schulte – keyboards (1998–2002)
 Felix Ü. Walzer – keyboards (2002–2010)
 Darin "Eddie" Smith – bass (2003–2006)
 Jan Jansohn – guitars (2007–2010)

Live members
 Shoggoth – vocals (2000)
 Thilo Feucht – guitars (2001–2010)
 Sebas – drums (2006)
 Nicolao Dos Santos – guitars (2012–2014)

Timeline

Discography
Studio albums
 Blacken the Angel (1998)
 Higher Art of Rebellion (1999)
 Chapter III (2001)
 Serpent's Embrace (2004)
 Phoenix (2009)
 In Darkness (2013)
 The Seven (2022)

Compilation albums
 Tomb Sculptures (1997)

Extended plays
 Bislang (1999)

Demo albums
 Carpe Noctem (1996)
 Near Dark (1997)

References

External links
 
 

1995 establishments in Germany
German black metal musical groups
Symphonic black metal musical groups
German gothic metal musical groups
Musical groups established in 1995
Musical groups disestablished in 2014
Musical quintets
Massacre Records artists